"Jai ho" (/d͡ʒeː ɦoː/), also transliterated "Jaya ho", is a Hindi phrase which can be roughly translated as "Let [the] victory prevail", "Let there be victory", or "May there be victory", "Victory Be To". In some Indian languages such as Gujarati it can also be heard used as a synonym for "Praise Be To". It often follows the name of a worshipped being or aspect, such as Lord Rama ('Ram Bhagwan [Lord Ram] ki Jay Ho'), or Mother Earth ('Dharti Mata ki Jay Ho'). More often it will be used without the verb inclusion of 'ho', a derivative of 'to be', presenting the above phrases as e.g. 'Ram Bhagwan ki jay', 'Victory/Praise to Lord Ram'.

When used as a title, the phrase may refer to:

"Jai Ho" (song), the theme song of the 2008 film Slumdog Millionaire
 "Jai Ho! (You Are My Destiny)", a version of the song recorded by The Pussycat Dolls, also in connection with the film
"Jaya Ho", a Christian hymn written in the Hindi language and usually titled "Victory Hymn" when translated into English
Jai Ho (film), a 2014  Bollywood film starring Salman Khan